Esna is a city in Egypt.

ESNA (Escadrille des Sous-Marins Nucléaires d'Attaque) is a French nuclear submarine squadron.

Esna or ESNA may refer to:

Places
Esna, Järva Parish, a village in Järva Parish, Järva County, Estonia
Esna, Paide, a village in Paide town, Järva County, Estonia

People
Esne (bishop) (died c. 787), an English Catholic bishop
Esna (singer) (born 1987), an American singer-songwriter based in South Korea
Esna Boyd (1899–1966), an Australian tennis player
Asko Esna (born 1986), an Estonian volleyball player
Sten Esna (born 1982), an Estonian volleyball player

Other
ESNA European Higher Education News, a news agency in Berlin, Germany
Esna Technologies Inc. or Esnatech, a Canadian software company
Evangelical Synod of North America, a Protestant Christian denomination in the United States